The 2008 South American Under-17 Women's Championship was the inaugural edition of the South American Under-17 Women's Championship. It was held from 12 to 30 January 2008 in Melipilla, Peñalolén and Villarrica, Chile.

First round

Group A

Group B

Final round

References

2008
CON
Women
International association football competitions hosted by Chile
2008 in youth sport
2008 in youth association football